Atylotus is a genus of horse flies in the family Tabanidae.

Species
Atylotus adjacens (Ricardo, 1911)
Atylotus advena (Walker, 1850)
Atylotus aegyptiacus (Kröber, 1926)
Atylotus agrestis (Wiedemann, 1828)
Atylotus agricola (Wiedemann, 1828)
Atylotus albipalpus (Walker, 1850)
Atylotus albopruinosus (Szilády, 1923)
Atylotus angusticornis (Loew, 1858)
Atylotus austeni (Szilády, 1915)
Atylotus basicallus (Szilády, 1926)
Atylotus bicolor (Wiedemann, 1821)
Atylotus calcar Teskey, 1983
Atylotus canarius (Enderlein, 1929)
Atylotus chodukini (Olsufiev, 1952)
Atylotus cryptotaxis Burton, 1978
Atylotus deminutus Oldroyd, 1957
Atylotus diurnus (Walker, 1850)
Atylotus duplex (Walker, 1854)
Atylotus fairchildi Dias, 1984
Atylotus farinosus (Szilády, 1915)
Atylotus flavoguttatus (Szilády, 1915)
Atylotus fulvianus (Loew, 1858)
Atylotus fulvus (Meigen, 1804)
Atylotus hamoni Ovazza & Oldroyd, 1961
Atylotus hasegawai Hayakawa, 1978
Atylotus hendrixi Leclercq, 1966
Atylotus horvathi (Szilády, 1926)
Atylotus hyalicosta Teskey, 1985
Atylotus insuetus (Osten Sacken, 1877)
Atylotus intermedius (Walker, 1848)
Atylotus intermissus Tendeiro, 1969
Atylotus jianshei Sun & Xu, 2008
Atylotus juditeae Dias, 1991
Atylotus kakeromaensis Hayakawa, Takahasi & Suzuki, 1982
Atylotus keegani Murdoch & Takahasi, 1969
Atylotus kerteszi (Szilády, 1915)
Atylotus kroeberi (Surcouf, 1922)
Atylotus latistriatus Brauer, 1880
Atylotus leitonis Dias, 1966
Atylotus loewianus (Villeneuve, 1920)
Atylotus lotus Burton, 1978
Atylotus miser (Szilády, 1915)
Atylotus nagatomii Hayakawa, 1992
Atylotus negativus (Ricardo, 1911)
Atylotus nigromaculatus Ricardo, 1900
Atylotus ohioensis (Hine, 1901)
Atylotus olsufjevi Dias, 1984
Atylotus ovazzai Tendeiro, 1965
Atylotus ozensis Hayakawa, 1983
Atylotus pallitarsis (Olsufiev, 1936)
Atylotus palus Teskey, 1985
Atylotus plebeius (Fallén, 1817)
Atylotus proditor (Bogatchev & Samedov, 1949)
Atylotus pulchellus (Loew, 1858)
Atylotus quadrifarius (Loew, 1874)
Atylotus rusticus (Linnaeus, 1767)
Atylotus santosi Dias & Serrano, 1967
Atylotus sawadai Watanabe & Takahasi, 1971
Atylotus seurati (Surcouf, 1922)
Atylotus shagrensis El-Hassan, Badrawy, Fadi & Mohammad, 2019
Atylotus sinensis Szilády, 1926
Atylotus sphagnicola Teskey, 1985
Atylotus sublunaticornis (Zetterstedt, 1842)
Atylotus subvittatus Séguy, 1934
Atylotus sudharensis Kapoor, Grewal & Sharma, 1991
Atylotus suzukii Hayakawa, 1981
Atylotus takaraensis Hayakawa & Takahasi, 1983
Atylotus talyschensis Andreeva & Zeynalova, 2002
Atylotus tauffliebi Raymond, 1975
Atylotus theodori Abbassian-Lintzen, 1964
Atylotus thoracicus (Hine, 1900)
Atylotus tingaureus (Philip, 1936)
Atylotus utahensis (Rowe & Knowlton, 1935)
Atylotus vargasi Philip, 1954
Atylotus venturii Leclercq, 1967
Atylotus virgo (Wiedemann, 1824)
Atylotus woodi Pechuman, 1981

References

Tabanidae
Brachycera genera
Taxa named by Carl Robert Osten-Sacken
Diptera of North America
Diptera of Europe
Diptera of Africa